Blaudzun is a Danish surname. Notable people with the surname include:

Blaudzun, stage name of the Dutch singer-songwriter Johannes Sigmond (born 1974)
Michael Blaudzun (born 1973), Danish cyclist
Verner Blaudzun (born 1946), Danish cyclist, father of Michael

Danish-language surnames